Ian Wilkinson (born 3 September 1960) is an English former professional rugby league footballer who played in the 1980s and 1990s.

Background
Ian Wilkinson was born in Hemsworth, Wakefield, West Riding of Yorkshire, England.

Playing career

Challenge Cup Final appearances
Ian Wilkinson played left-, i.e. number 4, in Halifax's 12–32 defeat by Wigan in the 1987–88 Challenge Cup Final during the 1987–88 season at Wembley Stadium, London on Saturday 30 April 1988.

County Cup Final appearances
Ian Wilkinson played  in Bradford Northern's 20–14 victory over Featherstone Rovers in the 1989–90 Yorkshire County Cup Final during the 1989–90 season at Headingley Rugby Stadium, Leeds on Sunday 5 November 1989.

John Player Trophy/John Player Special Trophy Final appearances
Ian Wilkinson played right-, i.e. number 3, in Leeds' 4–15 defeat by Wigan in the 1982–83 John Player Trophy Final during the 1982–83 season at Elland Road, Leeds on Saturday 22 January 1983, and played  in the 18–10 victory over Widnes in the 1983–84 John Player Special Trophy Final during the 1983–84 season at Central Park, Wigan on Saturday 14 January 1984.

References

External links
(archived by web.archive.org) Profile at therhinos.co.uk

1960 births
Living people
Bradford Bulls players
English rugby league players
Great Britain national rugby league team players
Halifax R.L.F.C. players
Leeds Rhinos players
People from Hemsworth
Rugby league centres
Rugby league fullbacks
Rugby league players from Wakefield
Yorkshire rugby league team players